Michael John Conrad (born July 29, 1933) is a retired United States Army major general who served as Commanding General, 1st Cavalry Division from 1984 to 1986. He graduated from the United States Military Academy with a B.S. degree in military science in 1956. Conrad later earned an M.S. degree in mathematics from the Rensselaer Polytechnic Institute in 1965.

Conrad served as a battalion commander in Vietnam from 1969 to 1970 and was awarded two Silver Star Medals, the Distinguished Flying Cross, two Bronze Star Medals, seventeen Air Medals and two Purple Hearts. He has also received the Distinguished Service Medal, two awards of the Legion of Merit and an Army Commendation Medal.

References

1933 births
Living people
People from Dayton, Ohio
United States Military Academy alumni
Rensselaer Polytechnic Institute alumni
United States Army personnel of the Vietnam War
Recipients of the Air Medal
Recipients of the Distinguished Flying Cross (United States)
Recipients of the Silver Star
Recipients of the Legion of Merit
United States Army generals
Recipients of the Distinguished Service Medal (US Army)